The Honeymoon's Over may refer to:

 The Honeymoon's Over (film), a 1939 American comedy film
 "The Honeymoon's Over" (Charmed), an episode of the TV series Charmed
 "The Honeymoon's Over" (Will & Grace), an episode of the TV series Will & Grace